Crofford is a surname. Notable people with the surname include:

Emily Crofford (born 1927), American children's writer
Joanne Crofford (born 1957), Canadian politician
Keith Crofford (born 1956), American television executive
Leslie Crofford, American academic

Surnames of English origin
Surnames of British Isles origin
English-language surnames